Lassan may refer to:

Lassan (music), the slow section of a rhapsody
Lassan, Germany, a town in Vorpommern-Greifswald, Mecklenburg-Western Pomerania, Germany

See also
 Lasan, an Indian restaurant located in Birmingham, England